Savalou is a little kingdom located in the Collines Department of Benin. The commune covers an area of 2,674 square kilometres and as of 2012 had a population of 35,433 people. It is the birthplace of Olympic Beninese hurdler Odile Ahouanwanou.

References

External links
Savalou

Communes of Benin
Populated places in the Collines Department